Týnec nad Labem is a town in Kolín District in the Central Bohemian Region of the Czech Republic. It has about 2,100 inhabitants. The historic town centre is well preserved and is protected by law as an urban monument zone.

Administrative parts

Villages of Lžovice and Vinařice are administrative parts of Týnec nad Labem.

Geography
It lies in the northwestern tip of the Iron Mountains, which passes into the lowlands of the Central Elbe Table and East Elbe Table. The town lies on the river Elbe.

History
The first written mention of Týnec nad Labem is from 1110, when there was a meeting of dukes of the Přemyslid dynasty, described in the Chronica Boemorum. After it changed owners several times, it was acquired by the Cistercian Sedlec Abbey. The monks founded here a monastery, inn and mill. After the Hussite Wars in 1463, Týnec was acquired by Vaněk of Miletínek, who had a fortress built here.

The next significant owner was Vilém II of Pernštejn. During his rule, Týnec was first referred to as a market town. In 1560, it was bought by Maximilian II. In 1600, Týnec was promoted to a royal chamber town by Emperor Rudolf II. The town was valued as an important crossing point across the Elbe.

At the end of the 18th century and in the 19th century, the town became an economic and cultural centre. There were mills, a wool spinning factory, and the only patent leather factory in Austria-Hungary. In 1864, an engineering factory was established. Týnec nad Labem was also the centre of the pearl industry.

Demographics

Sights
The Church of the Beheading of Saint John the Baptist is the main Catholic church in the town. It was founded around 1306. It was damaged by several fires and baroque rebuilt. The second church is the cemetery Church of the Blessed Virgin Mary of the Seven Sorrows from 1786.

Other sights include the fortress from the 15th century, and Marian column on the town square with a statue of the Virgin Mary from 1786.

Notable people
Michael von Melas (1729–1806), field marshal
Vilém Heš (1860–1908), operatic bass

Gallery

References

External links

Cities and towns in the Czech Republic
Populated places in Kolín District